The Providence Steel and Iron Company Complex is an historic industrial complex at 27 Sims Avenue in Providence, Rhode Island.  It consists of five one and two-story buildings, built between 1902 and 1951 for the Providence Steel and Iron Company (PS&I), whose corporate lineage begins with the Providence-based Builders Iron Foundry (BIF) in 1822.  BIF purchased the land on Sims Avenue in 1902 to replace old facilities on Codding Street.  PS&I was established as a subsidiary of BIF, producing both structural and ornamental steel products, and was separated from its parent by sale in 1905.  PS&I continued to operate on the Sims Street property until 2003, when it was sold to Milhaus LLC for redevelopment into a non-profit industrial arts facility, the Steel Yard.

The property was listed on the National Register of Historic Places in 2005.

In 2013, the Steel Yard won the Rudy Bruner Award for Urban Excellence silver medal for its adaptive reuse of the property.

See also
National Register of Historic Places listings in Providence, Rhode Island
The Rhode Island Council for the Humanities : Rhode Tour, PSI
the Steel Yard : Mission and History

References

Industrial buildings completed in 1902
Industrial buildings and structures on the National Register of Historic Places in Rhode Island
Buildings and structures in Providence, Rhode Island
National Register of Historic Places in Providence, Rhode Island